Stjepan Geng (born 2 March 1993) is a Croatian football defender, who most recently played for German lower league outfit FC 08 Villingen.

References

External links

Stjepan Geng at Sportnet.hr 

1993 births
Living people
Sportspeople from Virovitica
Association football defenders
Association football midfielders
Croatian footballers
Croatia youth international footballers
NK Slaven Belupo players
HNK Segesta players
FC 08 Villingen players
Croatian Football League players
Oberliga (football) players
Croatian expatriate footballers
Expatriate footballers in Germany
Croatian expatriate sportspeople in Germany